Carcelina is a genus of flies in the family Tachinidae.

Species
Carcelina clavipalpis (Chao & Liang, 1986)
Carcelina latifacialia (Chao & Liang, 1986)
Carcelina nigrapex (Mesnil, 1944)
Carcelina pallidipes (Uéda, 1960)
Carcelina shangfangshanica (Chao & Liang, 2002)
Carcelina unisetosa (Shima, 1969)

References

Tachinidae genera
Exoristinae
Diptera of Asia